Siegfried Adolf Handloser (25 March 1885 – 3 July 1954) was a Doctor, Prof. of Medicine, Generaloberstabsarzt (Four stars, NATO Rank OF-9) of the German Armed Forces Medical Services, Chief of the German Armed Forces Medical Services. He was convicted at the Doctors' Trial during the subsequent Nuremberg trials and sentenced to life imprisonment. His sentence was ultimately reduced to a 20-year term, though Handloser was released in 1954 and died of cancer the same year.

Early life 
Born in Konstanz, he had been a member of the German Army Medical Service since the First World War. In 1938, Handloser was promoted to the position of Army Group physician of the Army Group Command 3. In October, 1939, he was named honorary professor.

Career 
He had held the position of Chief of the Medical Services of the Armed Forces during World War II. It was the most important medical position in the entire German Armed Forces and the Waffen-SS.

He was convicted by the American Military Tribunal No. I in August 1947, and sentenced to life imprisonment. This was later reduced to 20 years and, in 1954, he was released. Shortly afterwards, Handloser died of cancer in Munich at the age of 69.

References

1885 births
1954 deaths
German Army generals of World War II
People convicted by the United States Nuremberg Military Tribunals
Physicians in the Nazi Party
People from Konstanz
People from the Grand Duchy of Baden
Prisoners sentenced to life imprisonment by the United States military
German prisoners sentenced to life imprisonment
Nazi human subject research
Deaths from cancer in Germany
Recipients of the Knights Cross of the War Merit Cross
Generals of the German Army (Wehrmacht)
German military doctors
Military personnel from Baden-Württemberg